Noor Hassan Rizvi is a Pakistani model and actor. He has acted in Pakistani television drama serials, including Aseerzadi, Humsafar, Maat, Mah-e-Tamam, Shanakht, Ladies Park and others.

Acting
He is known for his role of Villain Protagonist Khizer in the Pakistani TV serial Humsafar and the savior Hadeed in drama serial Maat. He has received  1st Hum Awards for drama serial Humsafar.

Aseer Zadi appeared in 2013.

Shanakht produced by Moomal Production, aired on Hum TV.

He also hosted the Red Carpet and the Making of 1st Hum Awards 2013.

Muqaddas is also one of Hassan's dramas where is he best known as Aatir.

Career

Rizvi is also set to making his film debut in Shoaib Khan's upcoming 2017 film '100 Crore' where he will play the lead male character opposite lead female Sanam Chaudhry.

Filmography

Film

Television

Awards achieved

 Best VJ (Live)for Boom On Live in 1st Atv Public Awards
 Humtv Award for Khizar in Humsafar

TV shows as host/Vj

Channel 3 Live Transmission (Live)   (Ch3)
Most Wanted (Live)    (ATV)
Weekend with Hassan (Recorded)    (PTV)
Music Masti (Recorded)     (PTV)
Boom On Live (Live)  (ATV)
On Campus (Recorded)   (The Musik)
The IQ Show (Recorded)   (The Musik)

He also hosted 1st Hum Awards red carpet and it's making with his co-host Sohai Ali Abro.

See also
 List of Pakistani actors
 List of people from Lahore

References

External links
 

1986 births
Living people
Pakistani male models
Pakistani male television actors
Pakistani television hosts
Male actors from Karachi
People from Islamabad
Lux Style Award winners
Radio personalities from Karachi